Sirli Hanni (born October 27, 1985 in Vastseliina) is a retired Estonian biathlete. She finished 18th in the 4×6 km relay and 84th in the 7.5 km sprint at the 2010 Winter Olympics in Vancouver.

References

External links
 Profile on IBU

1985 births
Living people
People from Võru Parish
Estonian female biathletes
Olympic biathletes of Estonia
Biathletes at the 2010 Winter Olympics